Haiti first participated in the Paralympic Games in 2008, sending a single athlete, Nephtalie Jean-Louis, to compete in powerlifting. Due to unspecified "problems with her weight", however, Jean-Louis was ultimately unable to compete, and was listed as a non-starter in her event (powerlifting).

Thus it was only at the 2012 Summer Paralympics in London that Haitian athletes competed for the first time. The country was represented by two athletes: Nephtalie Jean-Louis, in the shot put and javelin rather than in powerlifting; and Josue Cajuste, also in the shot put and javelin.

Haiti's participation in the Paralympics is overseen by the Comité National Paralympique d'Haïti.

Full results for Haiti at the Paralympics

See also
 Haiti at the Olympics

References